A by-election was held for the New South Wales Legislative Assembly electorate of Central Cumberland on 14 March 1888 because of the resignation of Varney Parkes.

Dates

Result

				

The by-election was caused by the resignation of Varney Parkes.

See also
Electoral results for the district of Central Cumberland
List of New South Wales state by-elections

References

1888 elections in Australia
New South Wales state by-elections
1880s in New South Wales